Scott Walker is the stage name of the American singer-songwriter Noel Scott Engel (1943–2019), former lead singer with The Walker Brothers.  He lived in the United Kingdom from the 1960s until his death.

His earliest material was released under his own name in the late 1950s. His most successful period in his career was between the years 1965 and 1970 where in he released three albums with The Walker Brothers, before going on to record a number of popular albums as a solo artist.

Walker's career faltered critically and commercially in the 1970s where he became stuck in a cycle of releasing lacklustre albums of MOR covers. In the mid-1970s Walker reformed The Walker Brothers with mixed results. Their final album together; Nite Flights (1978) was a sonic breakthrough for Walker. His next three albums – each released eleven years apart – developed and expanded his new direction.

For a detailed listing of Scott Walker's albums and singles with The Walker Brothers, see: The Walker Brothers discography.

Studio albums

Soundtracks

Compilation albums
 Looking Back with Scott Walker (1968, Ember Records)
 The Romantic Scott Walker (1969, Philips)
 The Best of Scott Volume 1 (1969, Philips)
 This Is Scott Walker (1972, Philips)
 Attention! Scott Walker! (1973, Phonogram)
 This Is Scott Walker Vol. 2 – Come Next Spring (1973, Philips)
 Spotlight on Scott Walker (1976, Philips)
 Fire Escape in the Sky: The Godlike Genius of Scott Walker (1981, Zoo Records) UK Indie No. 14
 Scott Walker Sings Jacques Brel (1981, Philips)
 The Best of Scott Walker (1982, Philips)
 Boy Child: The Best of Scott Walker 1967-1970 (1990, Polygram Records)
 No Regrets – The Best of Scott Walker and The Walker Brothers 1965–1976 (1992, Polygram Records) UK No. 4
 Scott Walker and The Walker Brothers 1965 – 1993 (1993, Nippon Phonogram)
 It's Raining Today: The Scott Walker Story (1967-1970) (1996, Razor & Tie)
 Boy Child: 67–70 (2000, Fontana)
 The Collection (2004, Spectrum Music/Universal)
 Classics & Collectibles (2005, Universal International)
 The Sun Ain't Gonna Shine Anymore – The Best of Scott Walker and The Walker Brothers (2006, Universal Music TV) UK No. 24

Box sets
 Scott Walker in 5 Easy Pieces (2003, Mercury Records)
 Scott Walker: The Collection 1967–1970 (2013, Universal)
 Live on Air 1968-1969 (2019, London Calling)

Extended plays
 Solo John/Solo Scott (1966, Philips) (Split-EP with John Walker) UK EP No. 4

Singles

Solo singles 1967–present
All non-UK singles list the country of release in brackets. B-sides vary in some territories.

Notes

A"I Don't Want To Hear It Anymore" was issued as a Scott Walker single in the US by Smash Records. The song and its b-side are actually Walker Brothers songs originally released in 1965 on the trio's début album; Take It Easy with the Walker Brothers.
B"Concerto pour guitare (Scene d'amour)", the b-side of "The Rope and the Colt", is not a Scott Walker song. It is performed by André Hossein. Walker's A-side and Hossein's b-side were each recorded for from the film Une Corde... Un Colt.
C"Patriot (A Single)" and "Tilt" are promo singles. They were released to promote Walker's 1995 album; Tilt. There were also respectively titled Scott 1 and Scott 2.

Scott Engel and Pre-Walker Brothers singles 1957–63
Prior to forming The Walker Brothers, Scott Walker recorded a series of songs under various names, most commonly as Scott Engel. Many of these recordings were later compiled and re-released credited to Scott Walker. Walker also collaborated with John Stewart in a series of short-lived groups, such as The Moongooners, Newporters and Chosen Few.

All singles credited to Scott Engel; except where indicated.

 "When is a Boy a Man" b/w "Steady As a Rock" (RKO Unique, 1957) (as Scotty Engel)
 "Livin' End" b/w "Good For Nothin'" (Orbit, 1958)
 "Charley Bop" b/w "All I Do Is Dream Of You" (Orbit, 1958)
 "Bluebell" b/w "Paper Doll" (Orbit, 1958)
 "Golden Rule of Love" b/w "Sunday" (Orbit, 1959)
 "Comin' Home" b/w "I Want to Know" (Orbit, 1959)
 "Take This Love" b/w "Till You Return" (Hi-Fi, 1959)
 "Anything Will Do" b/w "Mr Jones" (Liberty, 1961)
 "Anything Will Do" b/w "Forevermore" (Liberty, 1962)
 "Devil Surfer" b/w "Your Guess" (Martay, August 1963)
 "Mongoon Stomp" b/w "Long Trip" (Candix, February 1962) (as The Moongooners)
 "Willie and The Hand Jive" b/w "Moongoon Twist" (Essar, December 1962) (as The Moongooners)
 "Jump Down" b/w "Wish You Were Here" (Marsh, October 1962) (as Chosen Few)
 "Adventures In Paradise" b/w "Loose Board" (Scotchdown, August 1963) (as Newporters)
 "I Only Came To Dance With You" b/w "Greens" (Tower, 1966) (Scott Engel and John Stewart, recorded as The Dalton Brothers in 1963)

Music videos

Contributions
 Cemetery Without Crosses (1969) – "The Rope and the Colt"
 The Go-Between (1971) – "I Still See You"
 Toxic Affair (1993) – "Man From Reno" (with Goran Bregovic)
 To Have And To Hold OST (1996, Mute Records) – "I Threw It All Away"
 The World Is Not Enough OST (1999, MCA Records) – "Only Myself To Blame"
 Plague Songs (2006, 4AD) – "Darkness"
 Two Suns (2009, Parlophone) – "The Big Sleep" (with Bat for Lashes)

Production

Tribute albums
 Angel of Ashes: A Tribute to Scott Walker (2005, Tansformadores)
 Scott Walker: 30 Century Man (May 26, 2009, Lakeshore Records)
 Songs from Montague Terrace (September 16, 2013, All Souls Music)

References

Discographies of American artists
Rock music discographies
Pop music discographies
Discography